The 1982 Arkansas Razorbacks football team represented the University of Arkansas during the 1982 NCAA Division I-A football season. Arkansas had two consensus All-Americans in 1982, Steve Korte, on the offensive line, and defensive lineman Billy Ray Smith. Smith anchored a defensive unit that was the number one scoring offense, giving up only 10.5 points per game, and ninth in the nation in terms of stopping the run, only giving up 96.7 yards per game. Billy Ray Smith was a consensus All American in 1981 as well, and would be picked fifth in the 1983 NFL Draft.

Schedule

Roster
QB Brad Taylor

Rankings

Game summaries
Going into this game, SMU needed a victory or a tie to claim the SWC championship and secure a trip to the Cotton Bowl. Arkansas, on the other hand, needed a victory over the Mustangs plus a win over Texas the following week. The game proved to be marred by controversy due to questionable officiating. 

Late in the fourth quarter Arkansas led SMU 17-10 with time winding down. From the Mustang 43 yard line, SMU quarterback Lance McIlhenny lofted a pass to receiver Jackie Wilson down the left sideline, with Wilson being defended by Arkansas cornerback Nathan Jones. The pass was long, and Jones was in fact in front of Wilson as both players went to the turf together. Jones was flagged for pass interference, and since that penalty was a spot foul instead of 15 yards at that time in college football, the ball was placed near the Arkansas 15 yard line. SMU would score the game-tying touchdown a few plays later, and the game ended in a 17-17 tie, handing the Mustangs the conference championship. Play-by-play announcer Keith Jackson would even say on live television that the pass interference penalty on Jones was "just a terrible call". The officiating crew was suspended after this game and the NCAA issued an apology to Arkansas. This egregious call directly influenced the NCAA to change the rules for pass interference over the following summer so that a pass interference penalty would be 15 yards and not a spot foul.

at SMU

at Texas

References

Arkansas
Arkansas Razorbacks football seasons
Bluebonnet Bowl champion seasons
Arkansas Razorbacks football